Saiful Islam Al-Payage, formerly known as Elimus Payage (born April 4, 1979), is an Indonesian Islamic preacher. His name was widely known when he was a contest participant of Dakwah TPI (or "DAI") da'wah contest at TPI in 2005.

Personal life
Born from a family of Christian priests in Papua named Simon Payage. Payage's childhood was spent in the village of Yahukimo Regency, and began attending Elementary School in Silimo Yahokimo Papua, then proceeded to YPPK Wamena Junior High School in 1991.

His intersection with Islam he got when meeting a Muslim businessman named Haji Baharuddin while he was in school. Realizing that Papua is not good for education, Payage decided to move to Java. In Java he was introduced to KH Raden Ahmad Fawaid As'ad Syamsul Arifin who is one of the board of Salafiyah Syafi'iyah Pesantren, Situbondo, East Java. Payage then converted from Christianity to Islam. During the study both in pesantren and in formal schools in Situbondo, Payage is known as a smart student and able to understand Islamic religious education quickly.

Career
Payage is currently the head of Indonesian Ulema Council of Papua branch, a position he achieved at a very young age of 34 years in 2014. He is now married to Luluk Kholifah. He is also known for advocating a dialogue between Free Papua Movement and Government of Indonesia.

References

1979 births
Living people
People from Highland Papua
Papuan people
Indonesian Muslims
Indonesian Muslim missionaries
Sunni clerics
Converts to Islam
Converts to Islam from Christianity
Indonesian former Christians
21st-century Muslim scholars of Islam